Sprite Creek is a river in Fulton County and Herkimer County in the U.S. State of New York. It begins at Canada Lake northwest of the Hamlet of Caroga Lake, and flows through Lily Lake before converging with the East Canada Creek northeast of the Village of Dolgeville.

References 

Rivers of Fulton County, New York
Rivers of New York (state)